The 1968 Tasman Championship for Drivers was a motor racing series contested over eight races during January, February and March 1968, with four races held in New Zealand and four in Australia. The championship was open to Racing Cars fitted with unsupercharged engines with a capacity equal or inferior to 2500cc. It was the fifth annual Tasman Championship.

The championship won by Jim Clark, driving a Lotus 49T.

It was the third and final Tasman Championship win for Clark who was killed in a Formula 2 crash on the ultra fast Hockenheim circuit in West Germany just over a month after the series concluded. Clark won the last of his twelve career Tasman Series wins when he won the 1968 Australian Grand Prix at the Sandown Raceway in Melbourne, only 0.1 seconds in front of the Dino 246 Tasmania of Chris Amon after a famous duel between the pair.

Reigning  Formula One World Champion Denny Hulme finished equal seventh in the series in his Formula 2 Brabham with a best finish of third in Round 3 for the Lady Wigram Trophy, his first race of the series.

Schedule

Points system
Points were awarded at each race on the following basis: 

Championship placings were determined by the total number of points scored by a driver in all races.

Championship standings

References

1968
Tasman Series
Tasman Series